Caymus Vineyards is a Napa winery owned by Chuck Wagner and his family. It was named for George Yount's Rancho Caymus land grant, which in turn was named for the villages of Kaimus, the Wappo settlements previously existing in the region.

History
The Wagner family has farmed the current Caymus property to wine grapes since the 1940s; until 1972, when the winery was established, the fruit was sold to other area wineries.

The vineyard was planted to Nathan Fay's clone of Cabernet Sauvignon in the 1960s. Fay also famously provided grapes to Stag's Leap Wine Cellars.

In 1975, the winery hired Randy Dunn as winemaker, and offered the first vintage of their flagship wine, the Caymus Special Selection. The Special Selection is not produced every year, but only in "better years" (the last vintage of Special Selection not to be released was 1996). In 1989 the 1984 Special Selection was named Wine Spectator magazine’s “Wine of the Year.” The 1990 Special Selection received the same title in 1994, making Caymus the only winery in the world to have received the award twice.  The winery makes a "regular" cabernet that is released annually. 

Chuck Wagner, Charles' son, took over winemaking duties in 2015, a role which he continues to hold to this day.

Wines
In addition to the two Cabernets, the Wagners also produce small amounts of zinfandel and sauvignon blanc under the Caymus label. The family also makes other wines under the "Wagner Family of Wine" -- Mer Soleil, Conundrum, and Belle Glos -- out of non-Cabernet varietals. Mer Soleil is a Chardonnay label made by Charlie Wagner, Chuck Wagner's eldest son, with two wines; the "Silver" is unoaked, while the "regular" sees barrels. Belle Glos is a Pinot noir label made by Chuck Wagner's other son, Joseph Wagner, with five wines; four single-vineyard wines, and a blend of vineyards that goes into "Meiomi." Conundrum produces non-varietal white and red wine.

References

1972 establishments in California
Wineries in Napa Valley
Companies based in Napa County, California
American companies established in 1972 
Food and drink companies established in 1972